Aerva congesta, the Mascarene amaranth, is a small herbaceous plant of the genus Aerva.

Range
It is restricted to the island of Mauritius although it was formally found on Rodrigues where it is believed to have now gone extinct.

References

congesta
Flora of Mauritius